Creedman Coulee National Wildlife Refuge is a  National Wildlife Refuge in the northern region of the U.S. state of Montana. This very remote refuge is a part of the Bowdoin Wetland Management District (WMD), and is unstaffed. The refuge consists of only  that are federally owned, while the remaining  is an easement with local landowners and on private property. The refuge is managed from Bowdoin National Wildlife Refuge.

References

External links
 Creedman Coulee National Wildlife Refuge - official site

National Wildlife Refuges in Montana
Easement refuges
Protected areas of Hill County, Montana